Islam is the largest religion in the Comoros. According to the 2006 estimate by the U.S. Department of State, roughly 98% of the population in the Comoros is Muslim. Virtually all Muslims in the Comoros are Sunni belonging to Shafi'i school of jurisprudence. Most adherents are Arab-Swahili, but there are also people of Indian, largely Gujarati, descent.

History
Local legend claims Islam was brought to the islands during Muhammad’s lifetime, brought by two Comorian nobles, Fey Bedja Mwamba and Mtswa Mwandze, who visited Mecca. Foreign Muslim merchants likely had a presence in the area as far back as the 9th or 10th century, due to the Comoros being actively involved in the Indian Ocean trade at the time. It's possible that small minorities of native Comorians could have converted to Islam during that time.

Historical evidence suggests Arab merchants and exiled Zayidi Persian Shirazi princes first introduced the religion. Islam has long played a central role in the Comoros. Ruling families learned Arabic, performed Hajj, and maintained ties with other Muslim communities, such as Kilwa, Zanzibar and Hadramawt. Several Sufi tariqa, including the Shadhili, the Qadiriya, and the Rifa'i, are also active.

Hassan ibn Issa, a 16th-century Shirazi chief who claimed descent from the Islamic prophet Muhammad, encouraged conversion and constructed numerous masaajid. In the 19th century, Sheikh Abdalah Darwesh initiated the Shadiliya tariqa in the Comoros. Born in Grande Comore, Sheikh Darwesh traveled throughout the Middle East and later converted Said Muhammad Al-Maarouf (d. 1904), who became the Shadilya’s supreme guide. Sheikh Al-Ami ibn Ali al-Mazruwi (d. 1949) was the first of the region's ulama to author Islamic literature in Swahili. Al-Habib Omar b. Ahmed Bin Sumeit (d. 1976) studied in Arab countries before serving as teacher and qadi in Madagascar, Zanzibar, and, after 1967, the Comoros.

Mosques and holy places

Hundreds of mosques are scattered throughout the islands, as well as numerous madrassah. Practically all children attend Quranic School for two or three years, usually starting around the age of five; there they learn the rudiments of Islam and Arabic linguistics. When rural children attend these schools, they sometimes move away from home and assist their teacher in working his land. In 1998, a new Grand Mosque, financed by the emir of Sharjah, was inaugurated in Moroni. The tombs of Islamic holy men and founders of ṭarīqah are frequently visited on religious occasions.

Holidays and festivals
Comorians follow religious observances conscientiously and strictly adhere to religious orthodoxy. During colonization, the French did not attempt to supplant Islamic practices and were careful to respect the precedents of sharia as interpreted by the Shafi'i school of thought. All Muslim holidays are observed, including Id al-Adha, Muharram, Ashura, Mawlid, Laylat al-Mi'raj and Ramadan. Mawlid is marked by celebrations culminating in a feast prepared for the ulama. Many women wear the chirumani, a printed cloth worn around the body. Comorians often consult mwalimus or fundi and marabouts for healing and protection from jinn. Mwalimus activate jinn to determine propitious days for feasts, have a successful marriage, conduct healing ceremonies, and prepare amulets containing Quranic ayat.

Political Islam
The chaotic economic and political climate since independence in 1975 has been detrimental to the development of human rights and social justice. Rival factions have sought to mobilize religious support both to uphold and contest political power and social inequality. Political opponents have relied on their own interpretation of the Quran and hadith, advocating Shariah to rectify political corruption. Competing Islamic views have entered politics, both to justify and challenge the government. European trained government officials have adopted Western political ideologies and secularism while continuing to support leaders of Islamic brotherhoods. Islamism and Wahhabism has become increasingly as students returned from Islamic studies abroad. In response to perceived injustice and chaos within the Comorian government, Islamists hope to create an Islamic republic. Suspected al-Qaeda member Fazul Abdullah Mohammed was born in Moroni in the Comoros and has Kenyan as well as Comorian citizenship.

See also
Islam by country
List of non-Arab Sahaba
Religion in the Comoros

References
Ahmed, Abdallah Chanfi. Islam et politique aux Comores: Évolution de l'authorité spirituelle depuis le Protectorat français (1886) jusqu'à nos jours. Harmattan, 1999.
Newitt, Malyn. The Comoro Islands: Struggle against Dependency in the Indian Ocean.Westview 1984.
Ottenheimer, Martin. Marriage in Domoni: Husbands and Wives in an Indian Ocean Community. Waveland Press, 1984.
Ottenheimer, Martin. Historical Dictionary of the Comoro Islands. Scarecrow Press, 1994.
 

Notes